The 58th Scripps National Spelling Bee was held in Washington, D.C. at the Capital Hilton on June 5–6, 1985, sponsored by the E.W. Scripps Company.

The winner was 13-year-old eighth-grader Balu Natarajan of Bolingbrook, Illinois, in his third appearance at the Bee (he finished 45th in 1983 and 63rd in 1984), the first winner from the Chicago area. He spelled "milieu" for the win. Second place went to 13-year-old Kate Lingley of Dover-Foxcroft, Maine, who missed "farrago". Another 13-year-old, Tanya Solomon of Kansas City, Missouri, took third, missing "syllepsis".

168 spellers competed in the Bee, 17 more than competed the previous year. There were 67 boys and 101 girls, including 19 repeat contestants, one 9-year-old, two 10-year-olds, 19 at age 11, 26 at age 12, 65 at age 13, and 55 at age 14. A total of 719 words were used.

Natarajan was the first Indian-American to win the Bee, and has been credited for inspiring the later dominance of Indian-Americans in the bee.

In addition to non-cash gifts, the first-place winner received $1,000. Total prize money to all finalists was $10,500.

References

External links
List of spellers and missed words in order, by round, from UPI.com

Scripps National Spelling Bee competitions
1985 in Washington, D.C.
1985 in education
June 1985 events in the United States